The Highlights routine competition of the 2022 European Aquatics Championships was held on 12 August 2022.

Results
The event was held on 12 August at 17:00.

References

Artistic